The 1958 Segunda División de Chile was the 7th season of the Segunda División de Chile.

San Luis de Quillota was the tournament's winner.

Table

See also
Chilean football league system

References

External links
 RSSSF 1958

Segunda División de Chile (1952–1995) seasons
Primera B
Chil